Erigeron elatus is a North American species of flowering plants in the family Asteraceae known by the common names swamp fleabane and swamp boreal-daisy.

Erigeron elatus is widespread across most of Canada, found in every province and territory except the 3 Maritime Provinces. It has also been found in the states of Washington and Alaska in the United States. It grows in tundra, bogs, floodplains, and the edges of ponds.

Erigeron elatus is a biennial or perennial herb up to 50 centimeters (20 inches) in height. It produces 1-8 flower heads per stem, each head as many as 120 pink or white ray florets surrounding numerous yellow disc florets.

References

elatus
Flora of Alaska
Flora of Canada
Flora of the Northwestern United States
Plants described in 1834
Taxa named by William Jackson Hooker
Flora without expected TNC conservation status